Charles Arthur Moser (January 6, 1935 – December 11, 2006) was an American literary critic and political activist. As a literary critic he is known for his interests in Russian and Bulgarian literatures and cultures. His political views are described as conservative.

Biography
In 1956, Charles Moser earned his B.A. (summa cum laude) in Slavic Languages from Yale University. In 1958 he earned his M.A. in Slavic Languages from Columbia University. The thesis of his 1962 Ph.D. (Columbia University) was  "Antinihilism in the Russian Novel of the 1860s".

During 1958-1959 he studied at Leningrad State University, as part of the first graduate student exchange between the United States and the Soviet Union.

After teaching at Yale (1960-1967), he joined the  Department of Slavic Languages and Literatures at the George Washington University, where he was chairman during 1969-1974 and 1980–1989.

He founded and cofounded a number of organizations, including University Professors for Academic Order (1970), Committee for a Free Afghanistan, and Freedom League. In 1986 and 1987 President Ronald Reagan nominated Charles Moser for membership on the National Council for the Humanities, however the nominations were rejected by the Senate.

In 1992, in Bulgaria, Moser founded the Free Initiative Foundation, to promote the transition of Bulgaria to democracy.

Personal life
Moser was born in Knoxville, Tennessee the son of Arthur Hurst Moser, Professor of Classics at the University of Tennessee and Sara Ridlehoover Moser. His wife, Anastasia Dimitrova-Moser was the daughter of Bulgarian politician G. M. Dimitrov. in 1992, after Anastasia Moser was elected General Secretary of the Bulgarian Agrarian Union, the Mosers moved to Sofia, Bulgaria.

References

External links 

 

1936 births
2006 deaths
American literary critics
Yale University alumni
Columbia Graduate School of Arts and Sciences alumni
Yale University faculty
George Washington University faculty
American expatriates in Bulgaria
Slavists